The 2021 WK League was the 13th season of the WK League, the top division of women's football in South Korea. The regular season ran from 26 April to 9 November 2021 (originally until 5 October, but was delayed because of the COVID-19 pandemic in South Korea).

Due to the COVID-19 pandemic, the total amount of rounds were reduced from 28 to 21 (same as the previous season).

Teams

Foreign players
The total number of foreign players was restricted to three per club, including a slot for a player from the Asian Football Confederation countries. Boeun Sangmu were not allowed to sign any foreign players due to their military status.

League table

Results

Matches 1 to 14

Matches 15 to 21

Season statistics

Top scorers

Play-offs
The semi-final was played as a single-elimination match, and the Championship Final over two legs.

Semi-final

Championship final
First leg

Second leg

Incheon Hyundai Steel Red Angels won 2–1 on aggregate.

References

External links
WK League official website 
WK League on Soccerway

2021
Women
South Korea
South Korea